Seismic magnitude scales are used to describe the overall strength or "size" of an earthquake. These are distinguished from seismic intensity scales that categorize the intensity or severity of ground shaking (quaking) caused by an earthquake at a given location.  Magnitudes are usually determined from measurements of an earthquake's seismic waves as recorded on a seismogram.  Magnitude scales vary on what aspect of the seismic waves are measured and how they are measured. Different magnitude scales are necessary because of differences in earthquakes, the information available, and the purposes for which the magnitudes are used.

Earthquake magnitude and ground-shaking intensity 

The Earth's crust is stressed by tectonic forces. When this stress becomes great enough to rupture the crust, or to overcome the friction that prevents one block of crust from slipping past another, energy is released, some of it in the form of various kinds of seismic waves that cause ground-shaking, or quaking.

Magnitude is an estimate of the relative "size" or strength of an earthquake, and thus its potential for causing ground-shaking. It is "approximately related to the released seismic energy."

Intensity refers to the strength or force of shaking at a given location, and can be related to the peak ground velocity. With an isoseismal map of the observed intensities (see illustration) an earthquake's magnitude can be estimated from both the maximum intensity observed (usually but not always near the epicenter), and from the extent of the area where the earthquake was felt.

The intensity of local ground-shaking depends on several factors besides the magnitude of the earthquake, one of the most important being soil conditions. For instance, thick layers of soft soil (such as fill) can amplify seismic waves, often at a considerable distance from the source, while sedimentary basins will often resonate, increasing the duration of shaking. This is why, in the 1989 Loma Prieta earthquake, the Marina district of San Francisco was one of the most damaged areas, though it was nearly 100 km from the epicenter. Geological structures were also significant, such as where seismic waves passing under the south end of San Francisco Bay reflected off the base of the Earth's crust towards San Francisco and Oakland. A similar effect channeled seismic waves between the other major faults in the area.

Magnitude scales 

An earthquake radiates energy in the form of different kinds of seismic waves, whose characteristics reflect the nature of both the rupture and the earth's crust the waves travel through. Determination of an earthquake's magnitude generally involves identifying specific kinds of these waves on a seismogram, and then measuring one or more characteristics of a wave, such as its timing, orientation, amplitude, frequency, or duration. Additional adjustments are made for distance, kind of crust, and the characteristics of the seismograph that recorded the seismogram.

The various magnitude scales represent different ways of deriving magnitude from such information as is available. All magnitude scales retain the logarithmic scale as devised by Charles Richter, and are adjusted so the mid-range approximately correlates with the original "Richter" scale.

Most magnitude scales are based on measurements of only part of an earthquake's seismic wave-train, and therefore are incomplete. This results in systematic underestimation of magnitude in certain cases, a condition called saturation.

"Richter" magnitude scale  

Richter established two features now common to all magnitude scales.

 First, the scale is logarithmic, so that each unit represents a ten-fold increase in the amplitude of the seismic waves. As the energy of a wave is proportional to A1.5, where A denotes the amplitude, each unit of magnitude represents a 101.5≈32-fold increase in the seismic energy (strength) of an earthquake.
Subsequent magnitude scales are calibrated to be approximately in accord with the original "Richter" (local) scale around magnitude 6.

All "Local" (ML) magnitudes are based on the maximum amplitude of the ground shaking, without distinguishing the different seismic waves. They underestimate the strength:

 of distant earthquakes (over ~600 km) because of attenuation of the S-waves,
 of deep earthquakes because the surface waves are smaller, and
 of strong earthquakes (over M ~7) because they do not take into account the duration of shaking.
The original "Richter" scale, developed in the geological context of Southern California and Nevada, was later found to be inaccurate for earthquakes in the central and eastern parts of the continent (everywhere east of the Rocky Mountains) because of differences in the continental crust. All these problems prompted the development of other scales.

Most seismological authorities, such as the United States Geological Survey, report earthquake magnitudes above 4.0 as moment magnitude (below), which the press describes as "Richter magnitude".

Other "local" magnitude scales 
Richter's original "local" scale has been adapted for other localities. These may be labelled "ML", or with a lowercase "l", either Ml, or Ml. (Not to be confused with the Russian surface-wave MLH scale.)
Whether the values are comparable depends on whether the local conditions have been adequately determined and the formula suitably adjusted.

Japan Meteorological Agency magnitude scale 

In Japan, for shallow (depth < 60 km) earthquakes within 600 km, the Japanese Meteorological Agency calculates a magnitude labeled MJMA, MJMA, or MJ.  (These should not be confused with moment magnitudes JMA calculates, which are labeled Mw(JMA) or M(JMA), nor with the Shindo intensity scale.) JMA magnitudes are based (as typical with local scales) on the maximum amplitude of the ground motion; they agree "rather well" with the seismic moment magnitude  in the range of 4.5 to 7.5, but underestimate larger magnitudes.

Body-wave magnitude scales 

Body-waves consist of P-waves that are the first to arrive (see seismogram), or S-waves, or reflections of either. Body-waves travel through rock directly.

mB scale 
However, it is not sensitive to events smaller than about M 5.5.

mb scale 
It was introduced in the 1960s with the establishment of the World-Wide Standardized Seismograph Network (WWSSN); the short period improves detection of smaller events, and better discriminates between tectonic earthquakes and underground nuclear explosions.

Measurement of  has changed several times. As originally defined by  mb was based on the maximum amplitude of waves in the first 10 seconds or more. However, the length of the period influences the magnitude obtained. Early USGS/NEIC practice was to measure  on the first second (just the first few P-waves), but since 1978 they measure the first twenty seconds. The modern practice is to measure short-period  scale at less than three seconds, while the broadband  scale is measured at periods of up to 30 seconds.

mbLg scale 

The ML scale was developed in southern California, which lies on blocks of oceanic crust, typically basalt or sedimentary rock, which have been accreted to the continent. East of the Rockies the continent is a craton, a thick and largely stable mass of continental crust that is largely granite, a harder rock with different seismic characteristics. In this area the ML scale gives anomalous results for earthquakes which by other measures seemed equivalent to quakes in California.

Nuttli resolved this by measuring the amplitude of short-period (~1 sec.) Lg waves, a complex form of the Love wave which, although a surface wave, he found provided a result more closely related to the  scale than the  scale. Lg waves attenuate quickly along any oceanic path, but propagate well through the granitic continental crust, and MbLg is often used in areas of stable continental crust; it is especially useful for detecting underground nuclear explosions.

Surface-wave magnitude scales 

Surface waves propagate along the Earth's surface, and are principally either Rayleigh waves or Love waves. For shallow earthquakes the surface waves carry most of the energy of the earthquake, and are the most destructive. Deeper earthquakes, having less interaction with the surface, produce weaker surface waves.

The surface-wave magnitude scale, variously denoted as Ms, MS, and Ms, is based on a procedure developed by Beno Gutenberg in 1942 for measuring shallow earthquakes stronger or more distant than Richter's original scale could handle. Notably, it measured the amplitude of surface waves (which generally produce the largest amplitudes) for a period of "about 20 seconds".

A modification – the "Moscow-Prague formula" – was proposed in 1962, and recommended by the IASPEI in 1967; this is the basis of the standardized Ms20 scale (Ms_20, Ms(20)). A "broad-band" variant (Ms_BB, Ms(BB)) measures the largest velocity amplitude in the Rayleigh-wave train for periods up to 60 seconds. The MS7 scale used in China is a variant of Ms calibrated for use with the Chinese-made "type 763" long-period seismograph.

The MLH scale used in some parts of Russia is actually a surface-wave magnitude.

Moment magnitude and energy magnitude scales 

Other magnitude scales are based on aspects of seismic waves that only indirectly and incompletely reflect the force of an earthquake, involve other factors, and are generally limited in some respect of magnitude, focal depth, or distance. Seismic moment is measured in Newton-meters (Nm or ) in the SI system of measurement, or dyne-centimeters (dyn-cm) in the older CGS system. In the simplest case the moment can be calculated knowing only the amount of slip, the area of the surface ruptured or slipped, and a factor for the resistance or friction encountered. These factors can be estimated for an existing fault to determine the magnitude of past earthquakes, or what might be anticipated for the future.

An earthquake's seismic moment can be estimated in various ways, which are the bases of the Mwb, Mwr, Mwc, Mww, Mwp, Mi, and Mwpd scales, all subtypes of the generic Mw scale. See  for details.

Seismic moment is considered the most objective measure of an earthquake's "size" in regard of total energy. However, it is based on a simple model of rupture, and on certain simplifying assumptions; it does not account for the fact that the proportion of energy radiated as seismic waves varies among earthquakes.

An earthquake's potential to cause strong ground shaking depends on the comparatively small fraction of energy radiated as seismic waves, and is better measured on the energy magnitude scale, Me.

Despite the usefulness of the  scale, it is not generally used due to difficulties in estimating the radiated seismic energy.

Two earthquakes differing greatly in the damage done

In 1997 there were two large earthquakes off the coast of Chile. In October a  quake in nearly the same location, but twice as deep and on a different kind of fault, was felt over a broad area, injured over 300 people, and destroyed or seriously damaged over 10,000 houses. As can be seen in the table below, this disparity of damage done is not reflected in either the moment magnitude nor the surface-wave magnitude. Only when the magnitude is measured on the basis of the body-wave or the seismic energy is there a difference comparable to the difference in damage.

Energy class (K-class) scale 

K (from the Russian word класс, "class", in the sense of a category) is a measure of earthquake magnitude in the energy class or K-class system, developed in 1955 by Soviet seismologists in the remote Garm (Tadjikistan) region of Central Asia; in revised form it is still used for local and regional quakes in many states formerly aligned with the Soviet Union (including Cuba). Based on seismic energy (K = log ES, in Joules), difficulty in implementing it using the technology of the time led to revisions in 1958 and 1960. Adaptation to local conditions has led to various regional K scales, such as KF and KS.

K values are logarithmic, similar to Richter-style magnitudes, but have a different scaling and zero point. K values in the range of 12 to 15 correspond approximately to M 4.5 to 6. M(K), M(K), or possibly MK indicates a magnitude M calculated from an energy class K.

Tsunami magnitude scales 
Earthquakes that generate tsunamis generally rupture relatively slowly, delivering more energy at longer periods (lower frequencies) than generally used for measuring magnitudes. Any skew in the spectral distribution can result in larger, or smaller, tsunamis than expected for a nominal magnitude. The tsunami magnitude scale, Mt, is based on a correlation by Katsuyuki Abe of earthquake seismic moment with the amplitude of tsunami waves as measured by tidal gauges. Originally intended for estimating the magnitude of historic earthquakes where seismic data is lacking but tidal data exist, the correlation can be reversed to predict tidal height from earthquake magnitude. (Not to be confused with the height of a tidal wave, or run-up, which is an intensity effect controlled by local topography.) Under low-noise conditions, tsunami waves as little as 5 cm can be predicted, corresponding to an earthquake of M ~6.5.

Another scale of particular importance for tsunami warnings is the mantle magnitude scale, Mm. This is based on Rayleigh waves that penetrate into the Earth's mantle, and can be determined quickly, and without complete knowledge of other parameters such as the earthquake's depth.

Duration and Coda magnitude scales 

Md designates various scales that estimate magnitude from the duration or length of some part of the seismic wave-train. This is especially useful for measuring local or regional earthquakes, both powerful earthquakes that might drive the seismometer off-scale (a problem with the analog instruments formerly used) and preventing measurement of the maximum wave amplitude, and weak earthquakes, whose maximum amplitude is not accurately measured. Even for distant earthquakes, measuring the duration of the shaking (as well as the amplitude) provides a better measure of the earthquake's total energy.

Mc scales usually measure the duration or amplitude of a part of the seismic wave, the coda. For short distances (less than ~100 km) these can provide a quick estimate of magnitude before the quake's exact location is known.

Macroseismic magnitude scales 
Magnitude scales generally are based on instrumental measurement of some aspect of the seismic wave as recorded on a seismogram. Where such records do not exist, magnitudes can be estimated from reports of the macroseismic events such as described by intensity scales.

One approach for doing this (developed by Beno Gutenberg and Charles Richter in 1942) relates the maximum intensity observed (presumably this is over the epicenter), denoted I0 (capital I  with a subscripted zero), to the magnitude. It has been recommended that magnitudes calculated on this basis be labeled Mw(I0), but are sometimes labeled with a more generic Mms.

Another approach is to make an isoseismal map showing the area over which a given level of intensity was felt. While the recommended label for magnitudes derived in this way is M0(An), the more commonly seen label is Mfa. A variant, MLa, adapted to California and Hawaii, derives the Local magnitude (ML) from the size of the area affected by a given intensity. MI (upper-case letter "I", distinguished from the lower-case letter in Mi) has been used for moment magnitudes estimated from isoseismal intensities calculated per .

Peak ground velocity (PGV) and Peak ground acceleration (PGA) are measures of the force that causes destructive ground shaking. In Japan, a network of strong-motion accelerometers provides PGA data that permits site-specific correlation with different magnitude earthquakes. This correlation can be inverted to estimate the ground shaking at that site due to an earthquake of a given magnitude at a given distance. From this a map showing areas of likely damage can be prepared within minutes of an actual earthquake.

Other magnitude scales 
Many earthquake magnitude scales have been developed or proposed, with some never gaining broad acceptance and remaining only as obscure references in historical catalogs of earthquakes. Other scales have been used without a definite name, often referred to as "the method of Smith (1965)" (or similar language), with the authors often revising their method.  On top of this, seismological networks vary on how they measure seismograms.  Where the details of how a magnitude has been determined are unknown, catalogs will specify the scale as unknown (variously Unk, Ukn, or UK). In such cases, the magnitude is considered generic and approximate.

An Mh ("magnitude determined by hand") label has been used where the magnitude is too small or the data too poor (typically from analog equipment) to determine a Local magnitude, or multiple shocks or cultural noise complicates the records. The Southern California Seismic Network uses this "magnitude" where the data fail the quality criteria.

Hailed as a milestone as a comprehensive global catalog of earthquakes with uniformly calculated magnitudes, they never published the full details of how they determined those magnitudes. Consequently, while some catalogs identify these magnitudes as MGR, others use UK (meaning "computational method unknown"). Subsequent study found many of the  values to be "considerably overestimated." Further study has found that most of the  magnitudes "are basically  for large shocks shallower than 40 km, but are basically  for large shocks at depths of 40–60 km." Gutenberg and Richter also used an italic, non-bold "M without subscript" – also used as a generic magnitude, and not to be confused with the bold, non-italic M used for moment magnitude – and a "unified magnitude" m (bolding added). While these terms (with various adjustments) were used in scientific articles into the 1970s, they are now only of historical interest. An ordinary (non-italic, non-bold) capital "M" without subscript is often used to refer to magnitude generically, where an exact value or the specific scale used is not important.

See also
 Magnitude of completeness

Citations

General and cited sources 

.

.

.

.

.

.

.

.

.

.

.

.

.

.

.

.

.

.

.

.

, NUREG/CR-1457.

. Also available here (sections renumbered).

.

.

.

.

.

.

, 310p.

.

.

.

.

.

.

.

.

.

.

.

.

.

.

.

.

External links
 Perspective: a graphical comparison of earthquake energy release – Pacific Tsunami Warning Center
 USGS ShakeMap Providing near-real-time maps of ground motion and shaking intensity following significant earthquakes.

 
Seismology measurement
Seismology
Earthquake engineering